Gunnislake was an electoral division of Cornwall in the United Kingdom. As a division of Cornwall Council, it returned one member from 2009 to 2013 before being redistricted into Gunnislake and Calstock. As a division of Caradon District Council, it returned one member from 1973 to 2003, when seats were rearranged.

Councillors

Cornwall Council

Caradon District Council

Cornwall Council division

Election results

2009 election

Caradon District Council division

Election results

1999 election

1995 election

1991 election

1987 election

1983 election

1979 election

1976 election

1973 election

See also

Politics of Cornwall
Caradon

References

Electoral divisions of Cornwall Council
Calstock